Ibenga Girls Secondary School is a Catholic girls boarding school providing secondary school education in Ibenga, south of Luanshya, Zambia. It has been described as "renowned" and "prestigious".

Ibenga Girls School was initially founded as St. Theresa's Secondary School in 1963, and run by Dominican Sisters. It later changed its name to Ibenga Secondary School. In 1994 the school's management changed, and the Dominican Sisters handed over to the Franciscan Sisters of Assisi.

Alumni
 Lindiwe Bungane, musician.
 Faith Kandaba, broadcaster.
 Christabel Mulala Mwanja, Mayor of Chililabombwe.
 Juliet Muyambo, local politician.
 Florence Mwanamakwa, Zambia's first female Sergeant-at Arms.
 Yichida Ndlovu, pilot.
 Christine Nyahoda, badminton player.

References

External links
 Ibenga Girls Secondary School

Educational institutions established in 1963
Girls' schools in Zambia
Secondary schools in Zambia
Catholic secondary schools in Africa
Boarding schools in Zambia
1963 establishments in Northern Rhodesia